Lieutenant Colonel Arthur John Barry  (1859-1943) was an English civil engineer and architect of the late 19th and early 20th century.

Early life 

Arthur John Barry was the fourth child of the architect Charles Barry, Jr. and his wife Harriet Gardiner Pitman May.  He was born on 21 November 1859 at 5 Woburn Place, Russell Square, Holborn and baptised at St George's, Hart Street, Bloomsbury.  He was educated at Uppingham School.

Family

The Barry family was notable in the nineteenth century in the field of architecture and engineering. Barry's grandfather was the architect Sir Charles Barry, his father the architect Charles Barry, Jr. and his uncles the civil engineer Sir John Wolfe Barry and the architect Edward Middleton Barry. Arthur John Barry was the last generation of the dynasty. His most significant projects were in China, India, Thailand and Egypt.

He married Mabel Maude Josephine Ostrehan (born at Hyderabad, India on 15 July 1864) at St. Paul's Cathedral, Kolkata on 29 February 1888.

Career

He was articled with his uncle Sir John and went to India in 1883.

At 24, in association with Chief Engineer in India Sir Bradford Leslie, he was Chief Engineer in charge of the construction of the Jubilee Bridge (India) over the Hooghley River between Naihati and Bandel which was completed in 1887.  The bridge is noteworthy as a cantilever truss bridge, constructed entirely by riveting without the use of nuts or bolts in the construction.

He was the Executive Engineer in charge of the construction of the bridge over the Damuda River and the work of the Damuda district of the Bengal-Nagpur Railway, of which he was afterwards Superintending Engineer of the Bengal section.

He returned to England in 1891 and entered into partnership with his uncle Sir John Wolfe-Barry.  In 1901 he entered into partnership with Sir Bradford Leslie as Barry and Leslie becoming in 1906 A.J.Barry and Partners.

In England, he was the Chief Engineer to the:
 Chipstead Valley Railway
 South Harrow Railway
 Crowhurst, Sidley and Bexhill Railway

He continued to work on international projects and was Joint Consulting Engineer in partnership with his uncle Sir John Wolfe-Barry to the:
 British and Chinese Corporation Limited
 Chinese Central Railway Limited
 Chinese Engineering and Mining Company Limited
 Shanghai Nanking Railway
 New Harbour and Port of Ching Wang Tao (Qinhuangdao) in the Gulf of Pechili
 Bombay Port Trust
 Kowloon-Canton Railway

He was Consulting Engineer to the:
 Johore State Railway
 Southern Punjab Railway
and other projects in India, Thailand (Siam) and Egypt.

Publications

Arthur John Barry Lecture on the Great Siberian Railway: Delivered at the Military School of Engineering, Chatham, December 19, 1900 London (1900)
Arthur John Barry Railway Expansion in China and the Influence of Foreign Powers in its Development, London (1910)

References

English civil engineers
1859 births
1943 deaths
People from Holborn
British bridge engineers
Harbour engineers
British railway civil engineers
People educated at Uppingham School
Commanders of the Order of the British Empire
Arthur John